Louis B. Juillerat is a former American football player and coach. He served as the head football coach at Baldwin—Wallace College—now known as 
Baldwin Wallace University—in Berea, Ohio from 1951 to 1953, Findlay College—now known as the University of Findlay—in Findlay, Ohio from 1961 to 1962, and Northwood Institute—now known as Northwood University—in Midland, Michigan from 1963 to 1967, compiling a career college football coaching record of 43–40.

Head coaching record

College

References

Year of birth missing (living people)
Living people
American football guards
American football tackles
Baldwin Wallace Yellow Jackets football coaches
Findlay Oilers football coaches
Muskingum Fighting Muskies football players
Northwood Timberwolves football coaches
High school football coaches in Ohio
Coaches of American football from Ohio
Players of American football from Akron, Ohio